Silver Creek is a stream in Jefferson County, Nebraska and Washington County, Nebraska, in the United States.

According to legend, the discovery of silver ore at the creek's banks caused the name to be selected.

See also
List of rivers of Nebraska

References

Rivers of Jefferson County, Nebraska
Rivers of Washington County, Nebraska
Rivers of Nebraska